"California Nights" is a song written by Marvin Hamlisch and Howard Liebling and recorded by Lesley Gore.  The song appeared on her 1967 album, California Nights.

Composition
The song was produced by Bob Crewe and arranged by Hutch Davie. The track features guitars and drum set in a 1960s pop fashion. The chorus includes multiples long tones over abnormal chords and the verses are noticeably accompanied by a soft electric piano. The lyrics speak of reminiscing about romantic evenings on the beach with a lover.

Billboard described the song as a "production rhythm ballad with groovy dance beat and strong vocal work has the
hit ingredients to put Miss Gore back up the Hot 100."

Commercial performance
The single peaked at number 16 on the Billboard Hot 100 in March 1967 but stayed on the chart for a then-lengthy 14 weeks, ranking 61 in the year-end Top 100.

Use in media
An edit of the song (removing the second verse and refrain) was lip-synced by Gore on the January 19, 1967 episode of the TV series Batman, "That Darn Catwoman". She played Pussycat, the Catwoman's protégé, who also wanted to be a singer.

Charts

Weekly charts

Year-end charts

Other versions
Wes Montgomery released an instrumental version of the song on his 1967 album, A Day in the Life.
Four King Cousins released a version of the song on their 1968 album, Introducing the Four King Cousins.

References

1960s ballads
1967 songs
1967 singles
1973 singles
Lesley Gore songs
Songs written by Marvin Hamlisch
Song recordings produced by Bob Crewe
Mercury Records singles
Songs about California